The Instrument Room is a room in Teylers Museum which houses a part of the museum's Cabinet of Physics: a collection of scientific instruments from the 18th and 19th centuries. The instruments in the collection were used for research as well as for educational public demonstrations. Most of them are demonstration models that illustrate various aspects of electricity, acoustics, light, magnetism, thermodynamics, and weights and measures. The rest are high-quality precision instruments that were used for research.

History of the room
Originally all of the museum's collections were housed in the Oval Room from 1784. The electricity instrument demonstrations tended to make a lot of noise and distracted the readers of the books in the gallery, and after the mineralogical cabinet was built for the center of the room, demonstrations there became more difficult and a new demonstration and lecture room was built on the north side (today the Print room). This new room shared its purpose with the art gallery but as the number of instrument cabinets increased, was felt to be too dark, leading to the creation of a separate painting gallery in 1838. The current instrument room was built as part of an 1880-1885 extension of the museum, designed to have daylight from both sides for better viewing of the experiments. It is located between the Fossil Room II and the Oval Room.

History of the collection
Though Pieter Teyler van der Hulst was a patron of the arts and sciences, he was not a member of the Natuur- en Sterrekundig Collegie, a science society in Haarlem that was founded in the Patientiestraat in 1775. The popularity of the study of science and the ideals of the Dutch enlightenment were such that after his death however, when Martin van Marum joined the young Teylers Stichting, this proved quickly to become the emphasis of the society in the years to come. Teylers Museum was not alone. The society Oefening door Wetenschappen was also started in Haarlem in 1798 and lasted until 1892. It was Haarlem's reputation for the study of science that attracted Van Marum to settle there. When he became director of the collection of the Koninklijke Hollandsche Maatschappij der Wetenschappen in 1778 and later, also of Teylers in 1784, he used the funds of both institutions to purchase expensive instruments and even whole scientific collections from personal estates. He started before he even worked there with a proposal to build his large elektriseermachine that forms the center attraction of the instrument room. Van Marum was not only the curator of the cabinet, he gave public laboratorium lectures from 1777-1803 on physics and geology. The number of demonstration models in the collection is directly related to his and his successors' need for demonstration models in Teylers lectures. Van Marum collected 350 demonstration models and set a precedent as lecturer-demonstrator for curators who came after him. Today there are over a thousand in the collection altogether.

Instruments on display 
The centerpiece of the Instrument Room is the large electrostatic generator built by John Cuthbertson in 1784. This apparatus is the largest flat-plate electrostatic generator of the world and the oldest piece in the room itself, which is filled mostly with items from the 19th century. Surrounding this centerpiece are 10 numbered cabinets filled with instruments accompanied by numbered cards that can be cross-referenced to a guide located in the room.

References
Teyler 1778-1978:studies en bijdragen over Teylers Stichting naar aanleiding van het tweede eeuwfeest, by J. H. van Borssum Buisman, H. Enno van Gelder, Pieter Teyler van der Hulst, Schuyt, 1978,

External links 
 The Cabinet of Physics of the Teylers Museum, a thematic website describing the Teylers Museum's Physical Cabinet collection in 3D.

Teylers Museum
History of physics
18th-century architecture in the Netherlands